Heavy Metal Soul by the Pound is the fifth full-length album by 24-7 Spyz. Released through the What Are Records? label, it is the first album to feature the band as a trio. Former drummer Joel Maitoza returned to replace Anthony Johnson, but the band decided not to replace departed vocalist P. Fluid. Instead, guitarist Jimi Hazel also became the lead singer (bassist Rick Skatore also shared lead vocal duties in concert).

The album consists of heavy metal, R&B and soul music.

In March 1996, six months before the release of Heavy Metal Soul by the Pound, the Enemy label released an alternate European version of the album entitled 6. This version of the album does not include the songs "Earth And Sky" and "Save The World." Instead, the album contains covers of The Association's "Along Comes Mary" and Love's "7 and 7 Is." The album is titled 6 due to it being the sixth release by the band, if including the This is...24-7 Spyz! EP.

Together, both versions of the album helped reignite the band's popularity in Europe and the United States, but personal tensions and disagreements between Hazel and Skatore would lead to the official breakup of 24-7 Spyz the following year.

Track listing

Heavy Metal Soul by the Pound

 "Spyz In Da House"
 "Love and Peace"
 "Yeah x 3"
 "If I Could"
 "Burned"
 "Simple Minded Simon"
 "Eyes Don't Lie"
 "Interlude"
 "El Lame"
 "Earth and Sky"
 "Free To Be"
 "Let Your Fancy Flow"
 "Crushonya"
 "No Hope For Niggaz"
 "Love For Sale"
 "Clique"
 "Save The World"

6 (European version)

 "Spyz in Da House"
 "Love and Peace"
 "Yeah x 3"
 "If I Could"
 "Burned"
 "Simple Minded Simon"
 "Eyes Don't Lie"
 "Interlude"
 "El Lame"
 "Free to Be"
 "Let Your Fancy Flow"
 "Crushonya"
 "No Hope for Niggaz"
 "Love for Sale"
 "Clique"
 "7 and 7 Is"
 "Along Comes Mary"

Credits
 Jimi Hazel: guitar, vocals
 Rick Skatore: bass
 Joel Maitoza: drums
 Doug Pinnick: vocals on "Love and Peace" and "Yeah x 3"

References 

1996 albums
24-7 Spyz albums
What Are Records? albums